Leung Chi Wing (born 29 April 1978 in Hong Kong) is a former Hong Kong professional football player and a current football coach. He is currently the Assistant Director of Football at Hong Kong Premier League club Kitchee and the current player at Hong Kong First Division club Wing Yee.

Coaching career
On 14 August 2016, Leung was hired as assistant coach by R&F ahead of their inaugural HKPL season.

On 10 June 2017, Leung left R&F to become the head coach of Dreams FC.

On 11 August 2019, Leung was appointed as the Assistant Director of Football at Kitchee.

Honours
Kitchee
Hong Kong League Cup: 2006–07

Notes and references

External links
Leung Chi Wing at HKFA

Profile at kitchee.com 

1978 births
Living people
Hong Kong footballers
Hong Kong international footballers
Association football defenders
Happy Valley AA players
Hong Kong Rangers FC players
South China AA players
Yee Hope players
Sun Hei SC players
Kitchee SC players
Tai Chung FC players
Eastern Sports Club footballers
Hong Kong First Division League players
Hong Kong Premier League players
Hong Kong League XI representative players
Footballers at the 1998 Asian Games
Asian Games competitors for Hong Kong